Zugzwang is a musical work by Juan Maria Solare.

It is subtitled  "Fifteen authentic miniatures about the strategy of chess" for quartet: violin (or flute), alto saxophone (or clarinet), double bass (or cello) and piano (or synthesizer). Cologne, 29 January - 6 February 1999. [3'15" in length]. Zugzwang is where a player (especially in chess) is forced to make a disadvantageous move because it is their turn. The work is dedicated to the chess grandmaster Lothar Schmid.

References

Compositions by Juan María Solare